Senator Denny may refer to:

Joseph H. Denny (1883–1962), Vermont State Senate
William H. P. Denny (1811–1890), Ohio State Senate